Bubalus wansijocki (sometimes misspelled Bubalus wansjocki) is an extinct species of water buffalo known from northern China during the Late Pleistocene.

A 2014 study on extinct Chinese buffalo species indicates that the related Bubalus fudi is a subspecies of B. wansijocki.

Paleoecology
Many of the faunal assemblages associated with Bubalus wansijocki indicate that it lived in a relatively warm and moist environment, with a mixture of grassland, forest and swamp. However, the period it lived in was associated with a cold environment and other assemblages its remains have been found in show it and other warm-adapted animals together with cold-adapted ones. It is now believed that northern China went through many short, abrupt periods of very warm and very cold climate change during the Late Pleistocene.

References

Prehistoric bovids
Pleistocene even-toed ungulates
Pleistocene mammals of Asia